Wim De Deyne (born 12 December 1977) is a Belgian short track speed skater. He competed at the 2002 Winter Olympics and the 2006 Winter Olympics.

References

1977 births
Living people
Belgian male short track speed skaters
Olympic short track speed skaters of Belgium
Short track speed skaters at the 2002 Winter Olympics
Short track speed skaters at the 2006 Winter Olympics
Sportspeople from Bruges